Ulukwumi, also known as Olùkùmi, is a Yoruboid  language spoken by the Olukumi people of Aniocha North LGA, Delta State, Nigeria.

Olùkùmi means 'my friend' in the Owé dialect of Yoruba and Igala. The Olukwumi are an Igbo people with Yoruba and Igala heritage. Dialects are Ugbodu and Ukwunzu, with Ukwunzu being more heavily influenced by Igbo than Ugbodu is.

Vocabulary
Below are some Olùkùmi words compared with the other Yoruboid languages Yorùbá (standard dialect), Òwé (a Yoruba dialect spoken in Kabba district of Kabba-Bunu LGA, Kogi State), and Igala, as given by Arokoyo (2012):

References

Sources
Arokoyo et al. 2022. Olùkùmi Living Dictionary. Living Tongues Institute for Endangered Languages. https://livingdictionaries.app/olukumi/entries/list
Eleshin, Alimot Folake. 2012. A comparative study of the morphosyntax of Olukumi and Standard Yorùbá: a minimalist approach. MA thesis, University of Ilorin.
Okolo-Obi, Bosco. 2014. Aspects of Olukumi Phonology. MA thesis, Nsukka: University of Nigeria; 117pp.
Obisesan, H. 2012. Lexical Comparison Of Olukumi, Owo Dialect And Standard Yoruba. Seminar paper presented to the Department of Linguistics and Nigerian Languages, University of Ilorin, Ilorin.

Yoruboid languages
Languages of Nigeria